Croatia competed at the 2022 World Games held in Birmingham, United States from 7 to 17 July 2022. Athletes representing Croatia won two gold medals and five silver medals. The country finished in 24th place in the medal table.

Medalists

Competitors
The following is the list of number of competitors in the Games.

Archery

Croatia competed in archery.

Men

Women

Beach handball

Croatia won the gold medal in the men's beach handball tournament.

Boules sports

Croatia won two medals in boules sports.

Dancesport

Croatia competed in dancesport.

Finswimming

Croatia won two silver medals in finswimming.

Karate

Croatia won one silver medal in karate.

Men

Kickboxing

Croatia won one silver medal in kickboxing.

References

Nations at the 2022 World Games
2022
World Games